Saints Thaddeus and Bartholomew Church of Tehran, (Armenian: ,), is an Armenian Apostolic church in Tehran, Iran. It is the oldest church in Tehran.

Location 

It is located in Armenians Alley , Molavi Avenue (fa), south of Tehran Grand Bazaar, close to now destroyed southern gate of Tehran.

History 

Armenians migrated from New Julfa to Tehran during the reign of Karim Khan Zand, mainly to involve in his construction plans to make Tehran his capital. These Armenians built Saints Thaddeus and Bartholomew Church in 1768. It was consecrated by Grigor Ter-Hovhannesian in September 1788.

The church building occupies an area of about 220 m², with a small courtyard in combination with a courtyard and rooms totally in an area of 350 m², imitating small churches of New Julfa. In late 18th and early 19th century, the church was the first and only cemetery of Christians in Tehran.

In 1970, original frescoes were discovered underneath the plaster on the interior walls.

Notable burials 
Charles Scott (1805–1841) – son of Sir Walter Scott 
Prince Alexander of Georgia (1770–1844) – Georgian royal prince
William Glen (1778–1849) – British Christian preacher  
Captain Zatti (d.1849) – Austian teacher at Dar ol-Fonun
Henry Lindsay Bethune (1787–1851) – Scottish military officer
David Mghrdichian Davidians (fa) (1788–1852) – doctor
Charles Wright Parker Alison (1810–1872) – British envoy

The church contains also a memorial stone for the killed Russian ambassador Alexander Sergeyevich Griboyedov (+ 1829) whose body was kept here until the transfer to his final grave in Tbilisi.

Bibliography 

 کتاب ارمنیان ایران، نویسنده:آندرانیک هویان، صفحه‌های (۱۱۱ تا ۱۵۷) انتشارات:مرکز بین‌المللی گفتگوی تمدنها با همکاری انتشارات هرمس، تاریخ:۱۳۸۰، شابک:۲-۰۰۷-۳۶۳-۹۶۴
 آلمار هوسپیان، نگاهی به زندگی ارمنیان تهران در گذشته نزدیک، سالنامه رافی، جلد اول، ۱۹۶۹ میلادی، صفحه: ۲۶۷
  «دانشنامهٔ تاریخ معماری و شهرسازی ایران‌شهر». وزارت راه و شهرسازی. بایگانی‌شده از روی نسخه اصلی در ۶ اکتبر ۲۰۱۹. دریافت‌شده در ۶ اکتبر ۲۰۱۹
  ژانت د. لازاریان (۱۳۸۲)، «روحانیون»، دانشنامه ایرانیان ارمنی، تهران: انتشارات هیرمند، ص. ۶۴، شابک ۹۶۴-۶۹۷۴-۵۰-۳
 هوویان، آندرانیک (۱۳۸۰). «کلیساهای ارمنیان در ایران». ارمنیان ایران. تهران: مرکز بین‌المللی گفتگوی فرنگ‌ها با همکاری انتشارات هرمس. ص. ۱۴۹–۱۴۸. شابک ۹۶۴-۳۶۳-۰۰۷-۲
 نخستین فضاهای زیستی و عبادی ارمنیان در تهران قدیم، نویسنده: دکتر حسن کریمیان / آرمینه مارقوسیان، فصلنامه فرهنگی پیمان - شماره ۴۲ - سال یازدهم - زمستان ۱۳۸۶

See also
Iranian Armenians
List of Armenian churches in Iran

References 

Tourist attractions in Tehran
Armenian Apostolic churches in Tehran
Cemeteries in Tehran